Edward a'Beckett  (16 April 1836 – 25 March 1922) was an Australian cricketer. He played two first-class cricket matches for Victoria.

Born: 16 April 1836

Holborn, London, England

Died: 25 March 1922 (aged 85)

Beaconsfield Upper, Victoria, Australia

See also
 List of Victoria first-class cricketers

References

1836 births
1922 deaths
Australian cricketers
Victoria cricketers
People from Holborn
Cricketers from Greater London
Melbourne Cricket Club cricketers